Radik Isayev (born September 26, 1989 in Ukhul, Akhtynsky District, Dagestan) is a Russian-born naturalized Azerbaijani taekwondo practitioner of Lezgin origin. He won the gold medal at the 2014 European Championships Men's 87 kg, also he won bronze in 2013 World Championships. Radik also won a gold medal at the 2016 Summer Olympics held in Rio.

Olympic and World Champion Radik Isayev from Azerbaijan won a gold medal at the 2016 Rio Summer Olympics. Radik became World Champion in 2015 and won bronze at World Championships in 2016. Radik became champion of 1st European Games in 2015. He is 2 times European Champion and 2 times World Cup Champion.
He became champion of Islamic Games in 2017.

References 

Azerbaijani male taekwondo practitioners
1989 births
Living people
Taekwondo practitioners at the 2015 European Games
European Games medalists in taekwondo
European Games gold medalists for Azerbaijan
Azerbaijani people of Lezgian descent
Olympic medalists in taekwondo
Medalists at the 2016 Summer Olympics
Taekwondo practitioners at the 2016 Summer Olympics
Olympic taekwondo practitioners of Azerbaijan
Olympic gold medalists for Azerbaijan
Naturalized citizens of Azerbaijan
Universiade medalists in taekwondo
Universiade bronze medalists for Azerbaijan
European Taekwondo Championships medalists
World Taekwondo Championships medalists
Medalists at the 2017 Summer Universiade
Islamic Solidarity Games medalists in taekwondo